The Swan Shopping Centre is an  shopping centre in Yardley, Birmingham, which opened in Spring 2012.

With its landmark high rise building, it stands on the A45 Coventry Road at its intersection with the A4040 Outer Ring Road (also the Birmingham Outer Circle Number 11 bus route), known as Swan Island.

In-store Events 

Since its opening there has been one event inside the Swan Shopping Centre. For the Diamond Jubilee of Elizabeth II Weekend, Free Radio hosted a "street party" inside the shopping centre with artificial grass. There were many other things happening too with music, having your picture taken as the Queen and more.

Current Stores 

There are 21 retail units in the shopping centre.

References

External links 
Swan Shopping Centre website
Planning application for redevelopment (pdf) 
1890 Ordnance Survey map of the Swan area – Swan Inn can clearly be seen on the map.

Buildings and structures in Birmingham, West Midlands